Sima Nikolić (born March 13, 1932) is a former tennis player who competed for former Yugoslavia.
 
Nikolić lost in the second round of the Wimbledon in singles in 1953 to Hugh Stewart. Nikolic lost in the first round of the Wimbledon in singles in 1954.

References

External links
 

Tennis players from Belgrade
Serbian male tennis players
Yugoslav male tennis players
Living people
1932 births